(For the Paris Church of the same name see Saint-Louis-en-l'Île)

Saint-Louis-en-l'Isle (Limousin: Sent Loís d'Eila) is a commune in the Dordogne department in Nouvelle-Aquitaine in southwestern France.

Population

See also
Communes of the Dordogne department

References

Communes of Dordogne